Sivalokanathar Temple is a Siva temple in Mamakudi in Mayiladuthurai district in Tamil Nadu (India).

Vaippu Sthalam
It is one of the shrines of the Vaippu Sthalams sung by Tamil Saivite Nayanar Appar.

Presiding deity
The presiding deity is known as Sivalokanathar Temple. The Goddess is known as Sivakamasundari.

Speciality
The sculpture of Tamil Saivite Nayanar Sambandar is found in this temple.

References

Hindu temples in Mayiladuthurai district
Shiva temples in Mayiladuthurai district